The Alphubel (4,206 m) is a mountain of the Swiss Pennine Alps, located between the valleys of Zermatt and Saas in the canton of Valais. It is part of the Allalin Group, a subgroup of the Mischabel Group, which culminates at the Dom (4,545 m). The summit of the Alphubel consists of a large ice-covered plateau, part of the Fee Glacier on its east side. The west side of the mountain is more rocky and much steeper. It overlooks the Weingartensee.

The nearest settlements are Täsch (north of Zermatt) and Saas-Fee.

Geography 
North of the Alphubel is the higher Täschhorn, the southernmost top of the Mischabel, from which it is separated by the saddle of Mischabeljoch (3,847 m), while the ridge to the south is less prominent running via the Alphubeljoch (3,771 m) to the Feechopf (3,888 m) and Allalinhorn. While the terrain drops steeply into the Mattertal valley to the west, the east side is flat and, compared to its neighbours, almost smooth. The characteristically flat summit of the Alphubel is mostly covered with firn and has, in addition to the main summit, a northern top of 4,188 m, which barely rises above the flat summit area.

From the Alphubel a prominent, ice-free, rocky arête, the Rotgrat, strikes westwards down to the Täsch Hut (Täschhütte, 2,701 m), while the main, north-south, ridge and an unnamed arête running northeast are largely covered by ice. Due to its considerable height and relatively low gradient of its slopes, there are several glaciers in the summit area of the Alphubel: To the northwest and west of the summit is the Weingarten Glacier, which has now disintegrated into three ice masses,  reaching down to about 3,100 m in front of which is Lake Weingarten (Weingartensee). The entire eastern flank is taken up by the Fee Glacier, one of the larger glaciers of the region, which extends over several square kilometres and still almost reaches the valley basin near Saas-Fee. The Alphubel Glacier, the smallest glacier on the summit, lies in the south-west.

Climbing history 
The first ascent of the mountain was by Leslie Stephen and T. W. Hinchliff with guides Melchior Anderegg and Peter Perren on 9 August 1860, starting at Täsch and via the south-east ridge and the Alphubeljoch.

Routes 
The morphology of the Alphubel and its proximity to the Saas-Fee funicular make the Alphubel one of the comparatively easier four-thousanders of the Swiss Alps to climb. Nevertheless, all the ascents have the character of a high mountain tour with all the typical dangers of such a tour.

The normal route leads from Berghaus Längflue (2,867 m) above Saas-Fee over the flat but crevassed Fee Glacier to the summit. The ascent takes 4-5 hours and is rated PD or WS ("wenig schwierig / a little difficult") on the Swiss Alpine Club's high tour scale.

Another option with Saas-Fee as the base is a high-level tour from Mittelallalin (3,457 m), which can be easily reached via the Metro Alpin funicular. From there, the ascent, partly over rock, leads via the Feejoch (3826 m), Feechopf and Alphubeljoch to the summit (also WS, 4 hrs).

From the west, the best known route leads from Täsch via Täschalp and the Täschhütte and from there over the Alphubel Glacier via the Alphubeljoch over the main south-south-east running ridge (Eisnase) to the summit. This route takes about 5 hours and is also rated WS.

Huts 
 Täsch Hut
 Berghaus Längflue
 Britannia Hut, via Mittelallalin
 Kin Hut (Kinhütte)
 Mischabeljochbiwak, a refuge hut on the eponymous saddle between the Alphubel and Täschhorn

See also

List of 4000 metre peaks of the Alps

References

External links

The Alphubel on SummitPost
The Alphubel on Mount Wiki

Alpine four-thousanders
Mountains of the Alps
Mountains of Valais
Pennine Alps
Mountains of Switzerland
Four-thousanders of Switzerland